The Reidsville and Southeastern Railroad was founded in 1905 and ran a  line between Reidsville and Ludowici, Georgia, USA.  In 1906 it became part of a merger of several railroads to form the Georgia Coast and Piedmont Railroad.

Defunct Georgia (U.S. state) railroads
Railway companies established in 1905
Railway companies disestablished in 1906
1905 establishments in Georgia (U.S. state)